"Gotta Make It" is the debut single by singer Trey Songz from his debut album I Gotta Make It. The song features rapper Twista and reached number 87 on the US Billboard Hot 100.

The song samples from "It's Forever" by The Ebonys.
 
The music video features a guest appearance by R&B singer Gerald Levert and was shot in Trey Songz's hometown of Petersburg, Virginia.

Charts

Weekly charts

Year-end charts

References

2005 songs
2005 debut singles
Trey Songz songs
Twista songs
Music videos directed by Marc Webb
Atlantic Records singles
Song recordings produced by Troy Taylor (record producer)
Songs written by Trey Songz
Songs written by Twista
Songs written by Harold Lilly (songwriter)
Songs written by Troy Taylor (record producer)
Songs written by Leon Huff
Songs written by Kenny Gamble